At the 1988 Summer Olympics in Seoul, four diving events were contested during a competition that took place at the Jamsil Indoor Swimming Pool, from 17 to 20 September and from 26 to 29 September, comprising 89 divers from 30 nations.

Medal summary
The events are named according to the International Olympic Committee labelling, but they appeared on the official report as "springboard diving" and "platform diving", respectively.

Men

Women

Medal table

Participating nations
Here are listed the nations that were represented in the diving events and, in brackets, the number of national competitors.

See also
 Diving at the 1987 Pan American Games

Notes

References
 
 

 
1988 Summer Olympics events
1988
1988 in diving